Myosin-Ic is a protein that in humans is encoded by the MYO1C gene.

This gene encodes a member of the unconventional myosin protein family, which are actin-based molecular motors. The protein is found in the cytoplasm, and one isoform with a unique N-terminus is also found in the nucleus. The nuclear isoform associates with RNA polymerase I and II and functions in transcription initiation. The mouse ortholog of this protein also functions in intracellular vesicle transport to the plasma membrane. Multiple transcript variants encoding different isoforms have been found for this gene. The related gene myosin IE has been referred to as myosin IC in the literature, but it is a distinct locus on chromosome 19.

References

Further reading

External links